Michael Joseph Blassie (April 4, 1948 – May 11, 1972) was a United States Air Force officer who was killed in action during the Vietnam War in May 1972. Prior to the identification of his remains, Blassie was the unknown service member from the Vietnam War buried at the Tomb of the Unknown Soldier at Arlington National Cemetery. After his remains were identified by DNA testing in 1998, they were reburied at Jefferson Barracks National Cemetery in St. Louis County, Missouri.

Biography
Blassie was born in St. Louis in 1948. After graduating from St. Louis University High School he entered the United States Air Force Academy, graduating in 1970. He then attended Undergraduate Pilot Training, receiving his aeronautical rating as an Air Force pilot in 1971. He subsequently qualified as an A-37 Dragonfly pilot and served as a member of the 8th Special Operations Squadron, deployed to Southeast Asia. Blassie died when his A-37B Dragonfly was shot down near An Lộc in what was then South Vietnam.

Orders, decorations and medals

Vietnam Unknown
Five months after the shoot down an Army of the Republic of Vietnam (ARVN) patrol inspected the crash site and retrieved partial skeletal remains, an ID card, dog tags, a wallet containing a family picture, part of a flight suit, and the remnant of a pistol holster. The ARVN turned the remains and the other crash site items over to Captain William C. Parnell, who was then serving as an operations officer at An Loc. The name he read on the ID card was Air Force Lt. Michael Blassie. Captain Parnell wrapped the remains, and the other items found at the crash site, in plastic and held them overnight.

Parnell soon turned the remains over to the Saigon mortuary, along with the ID card and other items. The remains were eventually sent to a search and recovery center in Thailand before being forwarded to the Army's central identification lab in Hawaii. They were initially identified by Mortuary Affairs as Blassie. The remains were reclassified as unknown when their projected age and height were judged not to match Blassie's.

The remains were then sent to Travis Air Force Base on May 24 and arrived at Andrews Air Force Base the following day.

Many Vietnam veterans, President Ronald Reagan and First Lady Nancy Reagan visited Blassie as he lay in state in the U.S. Capitol. An Army caisson carried his casket from the Capitol to the Memorial Amphitheater at Arlington National Cemetery on Memorial Day, May 28, 1984. President Reagan presided over the funeral and presented the Medal of Honor to the Vietnam Unknown. The President also acted as next of kin to the unidentified Blassie by accepting the interment flag at the end of the ceremony.

DNA identification had yet to advance to its current state when Blassie's remains were repatriated, and he lay in the Tomb of the Unknowns up to 1998, with visitors paying respects but unaware of his identity.

Articles in U.S. Veteran Dispatch in 1994 and 1996 had made the claim that Blassie was the Unknown, drawing on Defense Department records. A CBS News report in January 1998 subsequently made the same claim. They interviewed Parnell, by then a retired Colonel living in Florida. He related his story of wrapping the remains, with the dog tags, in plastic. After Blassie's family secured permission, the remains were exhumed on May 14, 1998. Based on mitochondrial DNA testing, Department of Defense scientists were able to identify Blassie's remains. On June 30, 1998, the Defense Department announced that the Vietnam Unknown had been identified. On July 10, Blassie's remains were transported to his family in St. Louis, and were later reinterred at Jefferson Barracks National Cemetery. The Medal of Honor bestowed upon him as the Vietnam Unknown was not transferred to Blassie after his remains were identified.

Following the removal of Blassie's remains from the Tomb of the Unknowns, the slab marking "Vietnam" over the crypt that once held his remains was replaced with one that read "Honoring and Keeping Faith with America's Missing Servicemen", as it was decided that the Vietnam crypt would remain a vacant cenotaph.

As the Medal of Honor was ceremoniously presented to the unidentified remains, it did not transfer to Blassiewho did receive four awards, including the Silver Star (see above), on his own merit for documented valor, heroism and achievements during his actions in combat in Vietnam.

See also
List of solved missing person cases

References

External links

Disposition of the Medal awarded to the Unknown Soldier from the Vietnam War
VA History Office Funeral Ceremony for Vietnam Unknown

1948 births
1970s missing person cases
1972 deaths
American military personnel killed in the Vietnam War
Aviators killed by being shot down
Burials at Arlington National Cemetery
Formerly missing people
Military personnel from St. Louis
Missing person cases in Vietnam
United States Air Force Academy alumni
United States Air Force officers
United States Air Force personnel of the Vietnam War